Hamlyn may refer to:

People 

 Alan Hamlyn, U.S.-English soccer defender of the 1960s and 1970s
 David W. Hamlyn, classicist and professor of philosophy
 Paul Hamlyn (1926–2001), founder of the Hamlyn publishing company
 William Hamlyn-Harris (b. 1978), Australian javelin thrower

Other 

Hamlyn (publishers), UK publisher non-fiction illustrated books
Hamlyn Heights, Victoria, a suburb of Geelong in Australia
Hamlyn Terrace, New South Wales, a suburb in the Central Coast
Hamlyn's monkey (Cercopithecus hamlyni), also known as the owl-faced monkey

See also
 Hamlin (disambiguation)
 Hamelin, German town